Evangervatnet or  Lake Evanger is a lake in Voss Municipality in Vestland county, Norway. The Vosso  River flows through both Vangsvatnet and Evangervatnet before it empties into Bolstadfjorden by the village of Bolstadøyri.  Evangervatnet is named for the village of Evanger, located on the eastern end of the lake. The last element vatnet is the definite form of vatn meaning lake.

European route E16 highway and the Bergen Line both run along the southern shore of the lake.  The northern shore of the lake is mostly mountainous and uninhabited.

See also
List of lakes in Norway

References

Lakes of Vestland
Voss